Gwinko (born  on June 4, 1973, in Okinawa, Japan) is a Japanese singer who is currently a member of the duo Kina & Gwinko Worldchamploo.

Biography
Gwinko was one of the first batch of students from the Okinawa Actors School. In 1986, she passed an audition hosted by CBS Sony and moved to Tokyo, becoming Okinawa Actors School's first graduate. Gwinko released her debut album Yesterday Today Forever and single "Star Ship (I'm Going High)" in 1987. She became known for her style of singing R&B with digital sound in the foreground with slightly husky and relaxed vocals, as well as her dance choreography reminiscent of that of Janet Jackson.

In 1988, Gwinko participated at CBS Sony's 20th anniversary event "New Blood 88–89". Later that year, she performed at Epic/Sony's 10th anniversary concert "Dance to Christmas". In the summer of 1989, Gwinko participated in the live tour "New Bloods Presents Funk a Hips Live Show" as a member of New Bloods. In October of that year, she became the co-host of the music program Hit Studio R&N alongside Ichiro Furutachi. On the October 13 episode, Gwinko and Furutachi were witnesses to an incident when rock band The Timers played an unscheduled performance of a song protesting FM Tokyo censorship policies.

In 1991, Gwinko released the single "Downtown Game", which was used as the opening theme of the anime series City Hunter '91. Shortly after the release of her album Tokyo Ukiuki Girl, she moved back to Okinawa. In 1994, Gwinko signed with Media Remoras and released her sixth album Princess Moon.

In 2020, Gwinko re-emerged from retirement and joined Shoukichi Kina to form Kina & Gwinko Worldchamploo.

Discography

Studio albums

Singles

Other recordings

Filmography

TV 
 Hit Studio R&N (1989–1990)

Film 
 Tanpenshū Step Out (1990)
 Heartbreaker: Dangan yori Ai wo Komete (1992)

Footnotes

References

External links 
 
 
 

1973 births
Japanese women pop singers
Living people
People from Okinawa Prefecture
Musicians from Okinawa Prefecture
20th-century Japanese women singers
20th-century Japanese singers
21st-century Japanese women singers
21st-century Japanese singers